Walter Hans Schottky (23 July 1886 – 4 March 1976) was a German physicist who played a major early role in developing the theory of electron and ion emission phenomena, invented the screen-grid vacuum tube in 1915 while working at Siemens, co-invented the ribbon microphone and ribbon loudspeaker along with Dr. Erwin Gerlach in 1924 and later made many significant contributions in the areas of semiconductor devices, technical physics and technology.

Early life
Schottky's father was mathematician Friedrich Hermann Schottky (1851–1935). Schottky had one sister and one brother. His father was appointed professor of mathematics at the University of Zurich in 1882, and Schottky was born four years later. The family then moved back to Germany in 1892, where his father took up an appointment at the University of Marburg.

Schottky graduated from the Steglitz Gymnasium in Berlin in 1904. He completed his B.S. degree in physics, at the University of Berlin in 1908, and he completed his PhD in physics at the Humboldt University of Berlin in 1912, studying under Max Planck and Heinrich Rubens, with a thesis entitled: Zur relativtheoretischen Energetik und Dynamik (translates as About Relative-Theoretical Energetics and Dynamics).

Career
Schottky's postdoctoral period was spent at University of Jena (1912–14). He then lectured at the University of Würzburg (1919–23). He became a professor of theoretical physics at the University of Rostock (1923–27). For two considerable periods of time, Schottky worked at the Siemens Research laboratories (1914–19 and 1927–58).

Inventions
In 1924, Schottky co-invented the ribbon microphone along with Erwin Gerlach. The idea was that a very fine ribbon suspended in a magnetic field could generate electric signals. This led to the invention of the ribbon loudspeaker by using it in the reverse order, but it was not practical until high flux permanent magnets became available in the late 1930s.

Major scientific achievements
In 1914, Schottky developed the well-known classical formula, written here as

.

This computes the interaction energy between a point charge q and a flat metal surface, when the charge is at a distance x from the surface. Owing to the method of its derivation, this interaction is called the "image potential energy" (image PE). Schottky based his work on earlier work by Lord Kelvin relating to the image PE for a sphere. Schottky's image PE has become a standard component in simple models of the barrier to motion, M(x), experienced by an electron on approaching a metal surface or a metal–semiconductor interface from the inside. (This M(x) is the quantity that appears when the one-dimensional, one-particle, Schrödinger equation is written in the form

Here,  is Planck's constant divided by 2π, and m is the electron mass.)

The image PE is usually combined with terms relating to an applied electric field F and to the height h (in the absence of any field) of the barrier. This leads to the following expression for the dependence of the barrier energy on distance x, measured from the "electrical surface" of the metal, into the vacuum or into the semiconductor:

Here, e is the elementary positive charge, ε0 is the electric constant and εr is the relative permittivity of the second medium (=1 for vacuum). In the case of a metal–semiconductor junction, this is called a Schottky barrier; in the case of the metal-vacuum interface, this is sometimes called a Schottky–Nordheim barrier. In many contexts, h has to be taken equal to the local work function φ.

This Schottky–Nordheim barrier (SN barrier) has played an important role in the theories of thermionic emission and of field electron emission. Applying the field causes lowering of the barrier, and thus enhances the emission current in thermionic emission. This is called the "Schottky effect", and the resulting emission regime is called "Schottky emission".

In 1923 Schottky suggested (incorrectly) that the experimental phenomenon then called autoelectronic emission and now called field electron emission resulted when the barrier was pulled down to zero. In fact, the effect is due to wave-mechanical tunneling, as shown by Fowler and Nordheim in 1928. But the SN barrier has now become the standard model for the tunneling barrier.

Later, in the context of semiconductor devices, it was suggested that a similar barrier should exist at the junction of a metal and a semiconductor. Such barriers are now widely known as Schottky barriers, and considerations apply to the transfer of electrons across them that are analogous to the older considerations of how electrons are emitted from a metal into vacuum. (Basically, several emission regimes exist, for different combinations of field and temperature. The different regimes are governed by different approximate formulae.)

When the whole behaviour of such interfaces is examined, it is found that they can act (asymmetrically) as a special form of electronic diode, now called a Schottky diode. In this context, the metal–semiconductor junction is known as a "Schottky (rectifying) contact'".

Schottky's contributions in surface science/emission electronics and in semiconductor-device theory now form a significant and pervasive part of the background to these subjects. It could possibly be argued that – perhaps because they are in the area of technical physics – they are not as generally well recognized as they ought to be.

Awards
He was awarded the Royal Society's Hughes medal in 1936 for his discovery of the Schrot effect (spontaneous current variations in high-vacuum discharge tubes, called by him the "Schrot effect": literally, the "small shot effect") in thermionic emission and his invention of the screen-grid tetrode and a superheterodyne method of receiving wireless signals.

In 1964 he received the Werner von Siemens Ring honoring his ground-breaking work on the physical understanding of many phenomena that led to many important technical appliances, among them tube amplifiers and semiconductors.

Controversy
The invention of superheterodyne is usually attributed to Edwin Armstrong. However, Schottky published an article in the Proceedings of the IEEE that may indicate he had invented and patented something similar in Germany in 1918.
The Frenchman Lucien Lévy had filed a claim earlier than either Armstrong or Schottky, and eventually his patent was recognized in the US and Germany.

 1939: first p–n junction

Legacy
The Walter Schottky Institute for semiconductor research and the Walter Schottky Prize are named after him.

Books written by Schottky
 Thermodynamik, Julius Springer, Berlin, Germany, 1929.
 Physik der Glühelektroden, Akademische Verlagsgesellschaft, Leipzig, 1928.

See also
Schottky transistor
Schottky junction solar cell
Surface-barrier transistor

References

External links
 Walter Schottky
 Biography of Walter H. Schottky
 Walter Schottky Institut
 
 Reinhard W. Serchinger: Walter Schottky – Atomtheoretiker und Elektrotechniker. Sein Leben und Werk bis ins Jahr 1941. Diepholz; Stuttgart; Berlin: GNT-Verlag, 2008.
 Schottky's math genealogy

Semiconductor physicists
1886 births
1976 deaths
German electrical engineers
20th-century German physicists
Humboldt University of Berlin alumni
Werner von Siemens Ring laureates
Academic staff of the University of Rostock
20th-century German inventors
German expatriates in Switzerland